The 1998 Air Canada Cup was Canada's 20th annual national midget 'AAA' hockey championship, played April 21–26, 1998 at the Sudbury Community Arena in Sudbury, Ontario. The Riverains du Collège Charles-Lemoyne defeated the host Sudbury Cara's Nickel Capitals in the championship game to win the gold medal. The Calgary Buffaloes won the bronze medal.  Calgary's Dany Heatley was the tournament's top scorer and most valuable player.  Other future National Hockey League players playing in this tournament were Sheldon Brookbank, Randy Jones and Krys Kolanos.

Teams

Round robin

Standings

Scores

Collège Charles-Lemoyne 7 - Don Mills 0
Calgary 6 - Saint John 5
Saskatoon 7 - Sudbury 2
Collège Charles-Lemoyne 6 - Saint John 2
Saskatoon 7 - Don Mills 2
Calgary 9 - Sudbury 2
Saint John 4 - Don Mills 2
Saskatoon 6 - Collège Charles-Lemoyne 1
Calgary 7 - Don Mills 1
Sudbury 9 - Saint John 0
Calgary 7 - Saskatoon 4
Sudbury 5 - Don Mills 2
Collège Charles-Lemoyne 5 - Calgary 5
Saskatoon 3 - Saint John 0
Sudbury 7 - Collège Charles-Lemoyne 7

Playoffs

Semi-finals
Collège Charles-Lemoyne 3 - Saskatoon 2
Sudbury 5 - Calgary 2

Bronze-medal game
Calgary 5 - Saskatoon 4

Gold-medal game
Collège Charles-Lemoyne 5 - Sudbury 4

Individual awards
Most Valuable Player: Dany Heatley (Calgary)
Top Scorer: Dany Heatley (Calgary)
Top Forward: Adrian Foster (Calgary)
Top Defenceman: Shawn Landry (Calgary)
Top Goaltender: Chad Yaremko (Regina)
Most Sportsmanlike Player: Krys Kolanos (Calgary)

See also
Telus Cup

References

External links
1998 Air Canada Cup Home Page
Hockey Canada-Telus Cup Guide and Record Book

Telus Cup
Air Canada Cup
Sports competitions in Greater Sudbury
April 1998 sports events in Canada